The Golden Calf is a 1930 American pre-Code comedy film directed by Millard Webb and written by Marion Orth and Harold R. Atteridge. The film stars Jack Mulhall, Sue Carol, El Brendel, Marjorie White, Richard Keene and Paul Page. The film was released on March 16, 1930, by Fox Film Corporation.

Cast    
Jack Mulhall as Philip Homer
Sue Carol as Marybelle Cobb
El Brendel as Knute Olson
Marjorie White as Alice
Richard Keene as Tommy
Paul Page as Edwards
Walter Catlett as Master of Ceremonies
Ilka Chase as Comedienne

References

External links
 

1930 films
1930s English-language films
Silent American comedy films
1930 comedy films
Fox Film films
Films directed by Millard Webb
American black-and-white films
1930s American films